YMT  may refer to:

 Youth Music Theatre UK a leading youth arts organisation and one of eight National Youth Music Organisations in the United Kingdom. On 4 December 2018 the organisation changed its name to British Youth Music Theatre
 Chibougamau/Chapais Airport IATA code, an airport in Quebec, Canada
 Yau Ma Tei, a place in Kowloon, Hong Kong
 Yau Ma Tei station, Hong Kong; MTR station code

Ymt or ymt may refer to :
 Yorkville Massage Therapy, a registered massage therapy clinic located in Toronto, Ontario, Canada
 Yersinia murine toxin, a protein associated with Yersinia pestis, the causal agent of plague
 Mator language (AKA Karagas language) ISO 639-3 code, a Siberian language